The Roman Catholic Diocese of Jiangmen/Kongmoon is a diocese located in the city of Jiangmen in the Ecclesiastical province of Guangzhou in China.

History
 January 31, 1924: Established as Apostolic Prefecture of Jiangmen 江門 from the Apostolic Vicariate of Shantou 汕頭
 February 3, 1927: Promoted as Apostolic Vicariate of Jiangmen 江門
 April 11, 1946: Promoted as Diocese of Jiangmen 江門

Special churches
Former Cathedral:
圣母无玷圣心堂（原本主教座堂）(Immaculate Heart of Mary Former Cathedral)

Leadership
 Bishops of Jiangmen 江門 (Roman rite)
 Bishop Paul LIANG Jian-sen, consecrated 30 March 2011
 LI Pen-shi (1981 – 2007) (without papal approval)
 Bishop Adolph John Paschang, M.M. (柏增) (April 11, 1946 – February 3, 1968).In 1969, when a new primary school was set up in Lower Ngau Tau Kok Estate, Kowloon, Hong Kong, the school founding Supervisor, Fr. John M Mcloughlin, MM, named the school Bishop Paschang Memorial School, after Bishop Adolph John Paschang. The school has been relocated to Kowloon Bay and renamed Bishop Paschang Catholic School. Sponsoring body of Bishop Paschang Catholic School is still the Maryknoll Fathers in Hong Kong.
 Vicars Apostolic of Jiangmen 江門 (Roman Rite)
 Bishop Adolph John Paschang, M.M. (柏增) (June 17, 1937 – April 11, 1946)
 Bishop James Edward Walsh, M.M. (華理柱) (February 1, 1927 – July 1936). Bishop Walsh Memorial School was founded in 1963 in memory of the good work of Bishop Walsh, who upon his release by the Communist government on 10 July 1970, was the last Western missioner to be released.

References

External links

Further reading

 GCatholic.org
 Catholic Hierarchy
 UCAN Diocese Profile

1924 establishments in China
Christianity in Guangdong
Jiangmen
Christian organizations established in 1924
Roman Catholic dioceses and prelatures established in the 20th century
Roman Catholic dioceses in China